Aliciana is a genus of moths in the family Oecophoridae.

Species
Aliciana albella (Blanchard, 1852)
Aliciana geminata Clarke, 1978
Aliciana longclasper Beéche, 2005

References

Oecophorinae